Rino Tirikatene (born 1972) is a New Zealand politician and a member of the House of Representatives, representing the Te Tai Tonga electorate since the . He is a member of the Labour Party. He comes from a family with a strong political history.

Early life
Born in Rangiora, Tirikatene affiliates to the Ngāi Tahu and Ngāti Hine iwi. He is the grandson of Sir Eruera Tirikatene and the nephew of Whetu Tirikatene-Sullivan. His grandfather and aunt between them held the Southern Maori electorate for 64 years from 1932 and 1996. As such, the name Tirikatene is for many voters synonymous with the Māori electorate that covers the southern part of New Zealand.

Prior to running for parliament, Tirikatene worked as a commercial lawyer with Simpson Grierson and in a variety of Māori economic development roles.

Member of Parliament

In Opposition, 2011–2017
Tirikatene stood for Labour in Te Puku O Te Whenua in the 1996 election. His father, Rino Tirikatene Senior, was originally selected for the seat but died suddenly on the campaign trail. Tirikatene was asked to replace his father. That year, New Zealand First won all Māori electorates, with Rana Waitai beating Tirikatene and Tu Wyllie defeating Whetu Tirikatene-Sullivan.

He was selected to represent Labour in the Te Tai Tonga electorate on 1 December 2010. Te Tai Tonga is one of the seven Māori electorates, covers the South Island plus Wellington and is New Zealand's largest electorate by area. In the 2011 New Zealand general election, Tirikatene was placed at number 45 on the Labour Party list.

He contested the Te Tai Tonga electorate against the incumbent, Rahui Katene of the Māori Party. Labour's selection of Tirikatene was criticised as cynical by Katene, as they are both from the same hapū, but this was rejected by Tirikatene, as "all Maoris connect up somewhere along the line". Tirikatene won the electorate with a margin of 1,475 votes. The electorate had previously been held by Labour, from  until 2005.

In 2013, Tirikatene voted against the Marriage Amendment Bill, which aims to permit same sex marriage in New Zealand, with fellow Labour MPs William Sio, Ross Robertson and Damien O'Connor.

In Opposition for the six years of his Parliamentary career, Tirikatene served variously as the Labour Party spokesperson for customs, fisheries, tourism and Treaty of Waitangi negotiations, as well as holding a number of associate spokesperson roles.

In Government, 2017–present
When the Labour Party formed a coalition government in 2017, Tirikatene was appointed chairperson of the Māori Affairs select committee.

During the 2020 general election, Tirikatene was re-elected by a margin of 6,855 votes, retaining Te Tai Tonga for Labour.

In early November 2020, Tirikatane was appointed as Parliamentary Under-Secretary to the Minister for Oceans and Fisheries and Minister for Trade and Export Growth with responsibility for Māori Trade. In a cabinet reshuffle by Prime Minister Chris Hipkins on 31 January 2023 Tirikatene was appointed Minister for Courts and Minister of State for Trade and Export Growth.

References

External links
 

1972 births
Living people
New Zealand Labour Party MPs
New Zealand MPs for Māori electorates
Ngāi Tahu people
Ngāti Hine people
Ngāti Kahungunu people
Members of the New Zealand House of Representatives
Unsuccessful candidates in the 1996 New Zealand general election
People from Rangiora
21st-century New Zealand politicians
Candidates in the 2017 New Zealand general election
Candidates in the 2020 New Zealand general election
Government ministers of New Zealand